WFFG may refer to:

 WFFG (AM), a radio station (1300 AM) licensed to Marathon, Florida, United States
 WFFG-FM, a radio station (107.1 FM) licensed to Corinth, New York, United States